Justino Eugenio Arriaga Rojas (born 20 September 1979) is a Mexican politician from the National Action Party. He was the mayor of his hometown of Salamanca, Guanajuato from 2012 to 2015. From 2009 to 2012, he served as deputy of the LXI Legislature of the Mexican Congress representing Guanajuato. He began his political career as municipal Secretary of Youth Action in the year 1999. He was also a SCAN trainer, State Counselor, and National Counselor as well.

Education
Rojas graduated with a law degree from Iberoamericana University. He a master's degree in politics and public management from ITESO as well as a Master's in Public Administration from the ITESM (Tecnológico de Monterrey). He has a corporate law diploma from Iberoamericana University and a diploma in leadership and management from Harvard University.

Political career
On January 5, 1999, he became a member of National Action Party (PAN). He served as a Youth Action Secretary, a State Counselor, and a National Counselor. Rojas was elected as a federal congressman (2009-2012). He was chosen by his party as a candidate for Mayor of Salamanca for 2012–2015. He is member of the CDE of the National Action Party (PAN) in Guanajuato. He is currently President of Municipal Directive Committee of PAN Salamanca.

Career
Rojas has served as a trial lawyer for EMCA Company and Special Agricultural Projects Coordinator in the Secretaria de la Reforma Agraria (Secretary of Agrarian Reform).

He served also as a tax lawyer in the SAT (Tax Service Administration). During the LXI Legislature (2009-2012), he was a federal congressman and a member of the Constitutional Points Commission, Agrarian Reform Commission, Climate Change Special Commission, Friendship Group between Mexico and South Korea (President), Mexico and Czech Republic Member. He was also part of the Latin American Parliament, Citizen Security Commission, Prevention and Combat of Drug Trafficking, Terrorism and Organized Crime.

He served as elected mayor of Salamanca, Guanajuato during the period from 2012 to 2015. Currently he is the CEAMEG director (Center of The Studies of the Advancement of Woman and Gender Equity).

References

1979 births
Living people
Politicians from Guanajuato
People from Salamanca, Guanajuato
Deputies of the LXIV Legislature of Mexico
Mexican people of Basque descent
National Action Party (Mexico) politicians
21st-century Mexican politicians
21st-century Mexican lawyers
Universidad Iberoamericana alumni
Deputies of the LXI Legislature of Mexico
Members of the Chamber of Deputies (Mexico) for Guanajuato